Alsinidendron is a genus of plants in the family Caryophyllaceae, whose species are often included in the genus Schiedea. There are four species, all federally listed endangered species endemic to Hawaii.

Selected species
 Alsinidendron lychnoides (Hillebr.) Sherff
 Alsinidendron obovatum Sherff
 Alsinidendron trinerve H.Mann
 Alsinidendron verticillatum (F.Br.) Sherff
 Alsinidendron viscosum (H.Mann) Sherff

References

Caryophyllaceae
Caryophyllaceae genera
Endemic flora of Hawaii
Taxonomy articles created by Polbot